Nouriya Al-Subaih is a former education minister of Kuwait. In January 2008, she survived a no confidence vote by MPs. After the 2009 general election, she was replaced as education minister by Moudhi Humoud.

References

21st-century women politicians
Living people
Year of birth missing (living people)
Government ministers of Kuwait
Women government ministers of Kuwait